Mesonoemacheilus petrubanarescui is a species of ray-finned fish from India. The specific name petrubanaescui honours the Romanian ichthyologist Petre Mihai Bănărescu. It grows to  standard length. It is endemic to the Western Ghats and is known from only two locations, the Netravati River and Kabani River in Karnataka and Kerala. It is a little known species which is rare and may be threatened by habitat alteration, sand mining and pollution. It turns up occasionally in the aquarium trade where it is sold as the "dwarf loach".

References

Nemacheilidae
Freshwater fish of India
Endemic fauna of the Western Ghats

Taxa named by Ambat Gopalan Kutty Menon
Fish described in 1984
Taxobox binomials not recognized by IUCN